Joseph David Ruhemann N'Guessan (born 15 July 1995) is an English professional footballer who plays as a forward.

N'Guessan played for Bromley at youth level, before joining the Stevenage youth academy in 2011. He was sent out on loan four times during the 2012–13 season in order gain first-team experience; spending time at non-League clubs Farnborough, Biggleswade Town, Banbury United and Corby Town. He returned to Stevenage and made his first-team debut in April 2013; later signing his first professional contract with the club in June that year. Further loan spells followed during the 2013–14 season; firstly, at St Neots Town, before scoring seven goals in 12 appearances for Arlesey Town. He also scored in League One for Stevenage in April 2014. 

Ahead of the 2014–15 season, N'Guessan joined Aldershot Town of the Conference Premier in another loan agreement. He then spent time on loan at St Albans City in March 2015. N'Guessan was released by Stevenage in May 2015 and joined the Queens Park Rangers development team for the 2015–16 season. He was released by QPR in the summer of 2016 and then spent a month at Maidstone United during the 2016–17 season. N'Guessan joined Cray Valley Paper Mills in August 2017 and spent two seasons playing regularly there, before injury curtailed his time in the first-team.

Club career

Stevenage
N'Guessan started his career at Bromley, before joining Stevenage's academy. A month into the 2012–13 season, having made no first-team appearances for Stevenage, he was loaned out to Conference South club Farnborough on a one-month loan agreement. He made one appearance during the month, as a 63rd-minute substitute in a 3–0 home defeat to Welling United on 15 September 2012. He then joined Southern League Division One Central club Biggleswade Town on a one-month loan deal 8 March 2013, starting in Biggleswade's 3–2 away defeat to Aylesbury on 23 October 2012. A move to Banbury United of the Southern League Premier Division on a one-month loan deal followed in January 2013, in order to gain further first-team experience. He scored on his debut in Banbury's 2–0 away victory over Chippenham Town on 26 January 2013, a win that secured their first victory in eleven matches. He made one further appearance during the loan spell, before joining Conference North club Corby Town on another one-month deal. He made his debut for Corby in a 1–0 victory over Stalybridge Celtic on 9 March 2013, and went on to make five appearances during this loan spell.

N'Guessan returned to Stevenage towards the end of the season, and made his first-team debut for the club as a 57th-minute substitute in a 2–0 defeat to Milton Keynes Dons at Broadhall Way on 27 April 2013. He signed a one-year contract with the club on 13 June 2013, his first professional deal. N'Guessan joined St Neots Town on loan for a month in October 2013, scoring on his debut in a 5–0 victory against Hitchin Town on 15 October 2013. He made four appearances in all competitions during the agreement, scoring once. He moved to Arlesey Town of the Southern League Premier Division in December 2013, managed by former Queens Park Rangers footballer Rufus Brevett. After scoring six times in six matches during the month, which included two braces, the loan agreement was extended for a further month. He played 12 times for Arlesey, scoring seven goals. He returned to Stevenage and scored his first goal for the club in a 3–2 victory against Walsall on 26 April 2014.

Ahead of the start of the 2014–15 season, N'Guessan joined Conference Premier club Aldershot Town on loan until 2 January 2015. He debuted for Aldershot as a 68th-minute substitute in a 3–1 victory against Altrincham on 9 August 2014. He scored twice in 19 appearances during his time at Aldershot, before returning to Stevenage and making three substitute appearances in League Two in the opening two months of 2015. He then joined St Albans City of the Conference South on 23 March 2015, on an agreement for the remainder of season. N'Guessan scored once in five appearances during the loan. He was released by Stevenage upon the expiry of his contract at the end of the season.

Queens Park Rangers
Following his release from Stevenage, N'Guessan joined Championship club Queens Park Rangers (QPR) on a one-year contract on 15 June 2015. He was placed in the club's Elite Development Squad. QPR director of football Les Ferdinand stated that N'Guessan had been "identified with the future in mind". He suffered a number of injuries during the season and was released by the club in the summer of 2016.

Maidstone United
After his departure from QPR, N'Guessan had a one-week trial with Kilmarnock, which was ultimately unsuccessful. He was recommended to Maidstone United manager, Jay Saunders, and subsequently signed for the National League club in December 2016. He made his debut as a late substitute in a 1–1 draw with Dover Athletic on 26 December 2016. N'Guessan played three times for Maidstone, all of which as a substitute, before being released on 31 January 2017. Saunders stated he wanted to keep N'Guessan, but the arrival of striker Joe Pigott meant he had to release him.

Cray Valley Paper Mills
N'Guessan signed for Southern Counties East Premier Division club Cray Valley Paper Mills on 27 August 2017. The 2017–18 season would serve as N'Guessan's first season of regular first-team football at one club, scoring 10 goals in 35 appearances. He remained at Cray Valley for the 2018–19 season, scoring 13 goals in 27 appearances. He helped the club reach the 2019 FA Vase Final during the season, but missed the final through injury. He sustained the injury in a match against Glebe. Describing N'Guessan as a "massive part of the club the last 18 months", Cray Valley manager Kevin Watson stated N'Guessan required an operation, which the PFA agreed to fund. Having not played during the 2019–20 season, N'Guessan was included in Cray Valley's list of injured players on 4 January 2020.

Career statistics

References

External links

Living people
1995 births
English footballers
Stevenage F.C. players
Farnborough F.C. players
Biggleswade Town F.C. players
Banbury United F.C. players
Corby Town F.C. players
Arlesey Town F.C. players
Aldershot Town F.C. players
St Albans City F.C. players
Queens Park Rangers F.C. players
Maidstone United F.C. players
Cray Valley Paper Mills F.C. players
English Football League players
Footballers from Lewisham
Association football forwards
Black British sportspeople
English people of Ivorian descent